Hygrotechuis conformis, is a species of aquatic bug.

References

Gerridae